Nallapadu railway station (station code: NLPD), is an Indian Railways station in Guntur of Andhra Pradesh. It is located at Nallapadu, a suburb of the city on the Nallapadu–Nandyal section. It is administered under Guntur railway division of South Central Railway zone.

References 

Railway stations in Guntur district
Railway stations opened in 1916
Railway stations in Guntur railway division